Estonia competed at the 2008 Summer Paralympics in Beijing, People's Republic of China.

Medallists

Sports

Shooting

Swimming

Men

Missing athletes
 Athletics: Endre Varik (Men's: Long jump, 100 m) did not compete. 
 Swimming: Einar Niin and Keit Jaanimägi did not compete.

See also
Estonia at the Paralympics
Estonia at the 2008 Summer Olympics

External links
Beijing 2008 Paralympic Games Official Site
International Paralympic Committee
 Estonian Paralympic Committee
Estonian Union of Sports For Disabled 

Nations at the 2008 Summer Paralympics
2008
Paralympics